Amandus of Strasbourg (circa 290-355) was, about 346, the first Bishop of Strasbourg. His feast day is 26 October.

References

Bishops of Strasbourg
Alsatian saints